Mananthavady is a municipality and taluk in the Wayanad district of Kerala, India.This is the most populous and second largest municipality in terms of area in Wayanad district

Etymology 
The popular view on the etymology is that the word is derived from "Maane Eytha Vady" (English: "The place where an arrow was shot at the deer"). This view is strengthened by the existence of a place called Ambukuthy, literally "the location where the arrow pierced", on the outskirts of the town.

Transportation
The Thalassery–Bavali Road passes through Mananthavady and is the town's main road, allowing connection to Mysore, Karnataka. The road to Mysore through Nagarhole National Park has been declared a National Highway by the central government; it is parallel to the Kabini River, night travel in this road is regulated so that the road is closed from 6PM to 6AM. The highway goes from Kainatty (at the junction of NH 212[766]) to Mysore via Bavali, Jayapura.

Climate

See also
 Kattikkulam
 Thirunelly
 Boys Town, Mananthavady
 Thalappuzha, Wayanad
 Palchuram

References

External links

Cities and towns in Wayanad district
Mananthavady Area